The WXV is an upcoming women's international rugby union competition that will be held annually, it is scheduled to be launched in 2023. The competition will consist of three tiers, WXV 1, WXV 2, and WXV 3. Each tier will consist of six teams that will be divided into two pools and will run in a split pool format, where teams only face teams from the other pool.

Background
With the expansion of the 2025 Rugby World Cup from 12 to 16 teams, the test calendar was restructured, with the WXV serving to revolutionise the women's international landscape. WXV was announced on 16 March 2021 with the inaugural edition intended to begin in September 2022, but due to the coronavirus pandemic, it was pushed back to 2023 to accommodate the postponed 2021 Rugby World Cup.

World Rugby will be investing £6.4 million in the tournament, and It is expected to be played within an international window from September to October, except for Rugby World Cup years.

Structure

WXV 1
WXV 1 will be a cross-pool competition consisting of the top three teams from both the Six Nations and Pacific Four Series. They will be divided into two pools consisting of teams from the same competition, but will only play opposition in the other pool. From 2026, the bottom ranked side will be relegated to WXV 2.

WXV 2
WXV 2 will also be a cross-pool competition of six teams divided into three pools. Pool A will consist of the 4th and 5th ranked teams from the Six Nations and the champions of the Oceania Rugby Women's Championship, and Pool B will consist of the 4th ranked team from the Pacific Four and the respective champions of the Asia Rugby Women's Championship and Rugby Africa Women's Cup. From 2026, the champions will be promoted to WXV 1. The bottom ranked team will be relegated to WXV 3.

WXV 3
WXV 3 was originally announced as a round-robin tournament consisting of four teams. However, this was revised to also be a six-team cross-pool competition, now consisting of the bottom ranked team in the Six Nations, the champion of the Rugby Europe Women's Championship, the champion of South America, and the runners-up of the respective regional tournaments in Asia, Africa and Oceania. The winner of WXV 3 will be promoted to WXV 2, while the bottom ranked team will compete in a play-off with the best non-competing side in the World Rugby Rankings.

References

WXV
World Rugby competitions